Blanche of Navarre (–1229) was Countess of Champagne by marriage to Theobald III, Count of Champagne, and regent of Champagne during the minority of her son Theobald I of Navarre between 1201 and 1222.

Life

Early life

She was the youngest daughter of Sancho VI of Navarre and Sancha of Castile, who died in 1179, about two years after Blanche's birth. Her eldest brother, Sancho VII, succeeded their father and was the last agnatic descendant of the first dynasty of kings of Navarre, the Pamplona dynasty, dying childless. Her elder sister Berengaria married Richard I of England.

Blanche married Theobald III, Count of Champagne, on 1 July 1199 at Chartres, when she was 22-years-old and he was 20-years-old.

Regent of Champagne

Theobald III died young on 24 May 1201, leaving her pregnant. When she gave birth to a son on 30 May 1201, he immediately became Theobald IV, Count of Champagne (Theobald I of Navarre). Blanche ruled the county as regent until Theobald turned 21 years old in 1222. The regency was plagued by a number of difficulties. Blanche's brother-in-law, count Henry II had left behind a great deal of debt. Henry was the elder son but had transferred the land to his younger brother, Theobald III. 

Furthermore, their son Theobald IV's right to the succession of Champagne was challenged by Henry's daughter Philippa and her husband, Erard I of Brienne, Count of Ramerupt and one of the more powerful Champagne nobles.  The conflict with the Briennes broke into open warfare in 1215, in what became known as the Champagne War of Succession, and was not resolved until after Theobald came of age in 1222. After the death of her husband, however, Blanche had taken immediate action to secure the county of Champagne for her son. She found King Philip at Sens and paid him homage, which was the first homage rendered by a countess. She did this to maintain wardship and the right over her lands and in exchange she promised to not marry without the king's permission. Prince Louis then proclaimed in a letter to Jean of Brienne, that neither he nor King Philip would hear a challenge against Theobald IV's claim until he was twenty-one. In this letter, Prince Louis also confirmed that Henry II did indeed transfer the land to his brother. At that time Theobald and Blanche bought out their rights for a substantial monetary payment. Blanche had also arranged the dowry of Henry II's elder daughter Alice of Champagne, when she married the young Hugh I of Cyprus. In the 1230s, in order to settle with Alice, Theobald IV had to sell his overlordship over the counties of Blois, Sancerre, and Châteaudun to Louis IX of France.

With her regency completed, in 1222 Blanche withdrew to the Cistercian convent of Argensolles, whose foundation she had funded herself, for her retirement.

Later years
Since some barons suspected Theobald for having a hand in the death of Louis VIII (in November 1226), Blanche of Castile withdrew his invitation to the coronation of Louis IX and proffered it to Blanche instead.

Blanche died on 13 March 1229, seven years after the end of her regency, at the age of 52. In her will she left 5 marks of gold to the Cathedral of Reims, which was used to build a statue to contain the Holy Milk of the Virgin.

After Blanche's death, her brother in retirement remained as King of Navarre and her son Theobald continued as Count of Champagne.  Their eldest sister, Berengaria of Navarre, Queen of England (widow of Richard the Lionheart), died without issue in 1230, leaving Sancho as the sole surviving child of Sancho VI. When he died in 1234, Blanca's son Theobald IV of Champagne was recognized as the next King of Navarre.  Theobald had married twice during Blanche's lifetime and had one daughter by the time of her death, who was also named Blanche.

Children

Blanche had two children with Theobald III of Champagne:
Marie – Blanche is noted as having borne an older daughter named Marie to Theobald III before his death in May 1201. References to this Marie in documentation are scant, but as Blanche was married in July 1199, Marie would have been under two years old at the time of her father's death. One of the conditions of Blanche's treaty with Philip II confirming her son's inheritance was that Marie had to be sent away to be raised in the royal court at Paris.
Theobald I of Navarre.

Notes

1170s births
1229 deaths
Female regents
Navarrese monarchs
Countesses of Champagne
Navarrese infantas
13th-century women rulers
House of Jiménez
12th-century nobility from the Kingdom of Navarre
13th-century nobility from the Kingdom of Navarre
Daughters of kings